Anderson Racing Karts is a manufacturer of open-wheel racing cars, specifically Superkarts. Andersons have won championships in all parts of the racing world and are current holders of European Superkart Championship, as well as titles in Great Britain, Germany, Sweden, Australia and New Zealand.

References 
Anderson Racing Karts official website

Car manufacturers of the United Kingdom
Automotive motorsports and performance companies
British racecar constructors
Superkart
Kart manufacturers